A secure tenancy is a type of tenancy in the United Kingdom created by the Housing Act 1980. Most tenancies started before 15 January 1989 are likely to be secure. The secure tenancy was replaced on 15 January 1989 for new tenancies by an assured tenancy, with weaker protection, by the Housing Act 1988.

References

English property law
Tenancies in the United Kingdom